Kotshila is a village, with a police station and a railway junction station, in the Jhalda II CD block in the Jhalda subdivision of the Purulia district in the state of West Bengal, India.

Geography

Location

Area overview
Purulia district forms the lowest step of the Chota Nagpur Plateau. The general scenario is undulating land with scattered hills. Jhalda subdivision, shown in the map alongside, is located in the western part of the district, bordering Jharkhand. The Subarnarekha flows along a short stretch of its western border. It is an overwhelmingly rural subdivision with 91.02% of the population living in the rural areas and 8.98% living in the urban areas. There are 3 census towns in the subdivision. The map alongside shows some of the tourist attractions in the Ajodhya Hills. The area is home to Purulia Chhau dance with spectacular masks made at Charida. The remnants of old temples and deities are found in the subdivision also, as in other parts of the district.

Note: The map alongside presents some of the notable locations in the subdivision. All places marked in the map are linked in the larger full screen map.

Demographics
According to the 2011 Census of India, Kotshila had a total population of 1,452 of which 753 (52%) were males and 699 (48%) were females. There were 253 persons in the age range of 0 to 6 years. The total number of literate people in Kotshila was 613 (51.38% of the population over 6 years).

Police station
Kotshila police station has jurisdiction over a part of the Jhalda II CD block. The area covered is 284 km2 and the population covered is 148,042. It has a 25.48 km interstate border with Jaridih PS in Bokaro district of Jharkhand.

Transport
State Highway 4A running from Tulin to Chas Morh (both in the Purulia district) passes through Kotshila.

The NSC Bose Gomoh-Hatia line of the South Eastern Railway passes through this CD block and there are stations at Kotshila and Jhalda. The Purulia-Kotshila branch line connects to the NSC Bose Gomoh-Hatia line at Kotshila.

Education
Kotshila Mahavidyalaya at Jiudaru is affiliated to Sidho Kanho Birsha University.

Healthcare
Muralhar Kotshila Rural Hospital, with 30 beds, is the major government medical facility in the Jhalda II CD block.

References

Villages in Purulia district